Hulu Selangor or Ulu Selangor may refer to:
Hulu Selangor District
Hulu Selangor (federal constituency), represented in the Dewan Rakyat
Selangor Ulu (state constituency), formerly represented in the Selangor State Council (1955–59)